Tulling is a village with about 500 inhabitants to the east of the Bavarian capital Munich in the district (German "Landkreis") of Ebersberg.

History 

The first known written reference to the village of Tulling dates back to 825.

Politically, Tulling is part of the community of Steinhöring which is ruled by major Alois Hofstetter.

Most of the social life happens at the community centre was opened in 2008 by various local clubs (including the local stopselclub, music club, volunteer fire department, etc.).

External links
 Homepage of Tulling

Ebersberg (district)